Born to Survive (subtitled The Best Of) is the second compilation and first greatest hits album by Australian country musician Troy Cassar-Daley. The album includes tracks from all six of Cassar-Daley's albums to date; plus two new songs including "Everything's Going to Be Alright" which was co-written with Don Walker. Born to Survive was released in July 2007 and peaked at number 18 on the ARIA Charts. The album was certified gold in 2008.

Track listing

Charts

Certifications

Release history

References

2007 greatest hits albums
Troy Cassar-Daley albums
Compilation albums by Australian artists
EMI Records compilation albums